Jean-Louis Pichon (born 1948) is a French stage director, opera manager and author.

Life and career

After studying Classics, Jean-Louis Pichon carried out research into theatre. In 1969, he attended a master's thesis devoted to Racine's work. As an actor, it is to Fernand Ledoux that he owes his training which lead to the world's first production of the Monde Cassé from Gabriel Marcel at the Alliance Française Theatre in 1971; Jean-Louis Pichon was both stage director and actor in this play where he embodied Antonnof.

Since then, his double occupation has been developed: he performed in the great classics (Britannicus, Andromaque, Le Cid, Le Jeu de l'Amour et du Hasard, Hamlet, Les Femmes Savantes and others) and also played many roles from the temporary theatre: Ionesco, Beckett, Pinter, Weingarten, Foissy, and others. His activities as a director are mainly in the straight theatre: Le Médecin malgré lui by Molière, Le Roi se meurt by Ionecso, Monsieur Barnett by Anouilh, Tartuffe by Molière, Huis Clos by Jean-Paul Sartre, En attendant Godot by Beckett and Le Comédien aux liens by Charles Rambaud.

Jean-Louis Pichon has always had a passion for opera and naturally directed his work into that sphere. First, with Le Testament de la tante Caroline by Roussel, Amadis by Massenet in 1988, the recording of which won the "Orphée d'Or" awarded by The National Academy of Opera, and Thérèse, which represented France at the European Festival of Culture in Karlsruhe before being played with great success in Poland for the commemoration of the Bicentenary of the French Revolution in 1989. His new production of Richard Cœur de Lion by Grétry was staged at the opera house in Nancy and Lorraine.

For the opening of the 1991-1992 season, he made a new production of Macbeth by Verdi, which was taken up again at the opera house in Nantes. His work on the rarely performed operas of Massenet earned him an invitation to the Teatro Massimo in Palermo which entrusted him to stage Esclarmonde in January 1993 (conducted by Gianandrea Gavazzeni). During the same year, Jean-Louis Pichon put on Il Pirata by Bellini at the opera house in Saint-Étienne, then in Nancy and Tours before accepting the invitation of the National Opera of Montevideo (Uruguay) to stage a new production of Macbeth. In March 1994, he produced a very attractive Turandot by Puccini. Later on, the Royal Opera of Wallonia asked him to undertake the staging of Carmen which opened the 1995-1996 season. This performance, taken up in Saint-Etienne, was then presented at the Teatro Massimo of Palermo in April 1996.

The staging of Thaïs by Massenet, made for the 4th Massenet Festival in Saint-Etienne in November 1996, was taken up in Nantes in January 1997 before representing France in Cairo in December 1997 for France-Egypt year. Pierre Médecin invited Jean-Louis Pichon for the unexpected return of La Dame Blanche at the Opéra-Comique in April 1997. In addition, he created a new production of the French version of Lucie de Lammermoor (Lucia di Lammermoor) for the Martina Franca Festival in July of that same year.

The 1998-1996 season stood out thanks to the revival of La dame blanche at the Opéra-Comique, of Lucie de Lammermoor in Saint-Etienne and a new production of Roma by Massenet at the Martina Franca Festival then, at the Teatro Massimo of Palermo. The 1999-2000 season saw the resurrection of Le roi de Lahore staged at the Massenet Festival and in Bordeaux in November 1999, and also the revival of Carmen at the Opera Theatre in Saint-Etienne, in Cosenza, in Wallonia and in Marseille.

In 2001, Martina Franca Festival invited him to give a lease of life to Gounod's opera La reine de Saba.

In November 2001, Jean-Louis Pichon directed Roma for the 6th Massenet Festival in Saint-Etienne, followed by Hérodiade which stood out in the reopening of the Massenet Theatre in Saint-Etienne and was taken up at the Royal Opera in Wallonia in May 2002. Finally, at the end of the season, a new production of Cavalleria rusticana was shown in Saint-Etienne and in Vichy.

During the 2002-2003 season, Jean-Louis Pichon created a new production of Lucia di Lammermoor in Avignon, of La reine de Saba and of Werther in Saint-Etienne and of Dialogues des Carmélites at the Maestranza in Seville.

In 2003, during the 7th Massenet Biennial event, he directed Sapho by Massenet.

He would join the Martina Franca Festival in July 2004 for the unearthing of one of Gounod's forgotten masterpieces, Polyeucte.

Among his recent productions, are the revival of Dialogues des Carmélites and a new production of the French version of Salome in collaboration with Nice Opera.

In 2005, he presents Dialogues des Carmélites in Santiago of Chile and stages Le jongleur de Notre-Dame for the 8th Massenet Festival and Werther in Bordeaux in 2006, then Polyeucte in Saint-Etienne.

In June 2006, Jean-Louis Pichon directed Les pêcheurs de perles by Bizet with the Shanghai Opera House before going back to Santiago for a new production of La Gioconda.

In February 2007, Jean-Louis Pichon staged Le roi d'Ys by Lalo at the Opera House in Saint-Etienne.
For the ninth Massenet Festival in November 2007 he put on a new production of Ariane that was greeted with enthusiasm both by the critics and the public.

In March 2008 he will take up Le Roi d’Ys at the Royal Opera in Wallonia before the production of Werther at the French May in Hong Kong.
 
Among his international projects : Lakmé in Cairo, Les Pêcheurs de perles in Santiago of Chile, La bohème in Monte Carlo and Liège.

Jean-Louis Pichon has been in charge of the running of the Opera Theatre in Saint-Étienne since 1983 where he is managing director and has been the artistic director of the Massenet Festival since 1990 (since its inception).

He is an Officer in the National Order of Arts.

References
Article on Pichon at Il Villagio Della Musica (in French)

Living people
French theatre directors
1948 births